George Ian Kenneth "Kenny" Ireland (7 August 1945 – 31 July 2014) was a Scottish actor and theatre director. Ireland was best known to television viewers for his role in Victoria Wood: As Seen on TV in the 1980s, and for playing Donald Stewart in Benidorm from 2007 until his death in 2014.

Career
Born in Paisley, Renfrewshire, Ireland was prominent in Scottish theatre and spent ten years as director of the Royal Lyceum Theatre in Edinburgh. When he left the post in 2003 he controversially attacked the Scottish arts establishment for providing "theatre on the cheap" and the Scottish Executive for putting plans for a National Theatre of Scotland on "the back burner". The National Theatre of Scotland was finally launched in 2006. He also appeared in an episode of Auf Wiedersehen, Pet as  journalist Sid Payne. In some early TV appearances (e.g. the BBC's "Five Red Herrings") he was credited as "Ian Ireland".

Ireland's directing credits include Guys & Dolls, A View from the Bridge, Romeo and Juliet, Phaedra, Macbeth, Lovers, The Anatomist, Clay Bull, Mother Courage, Much Ado About Nothing, Of Mice and Men, Private Lives, Oleanna, The Gowk Storm, Waiting for Godot, Dancing at Lughnasa, Oedipus Tyrannos and A Midsummer Night's Dream.

He also appeared in Acorn Antiques, the STV series Taggart, the 1983 film Local Hero, Dempsey and Makepeace episode "In the Dark",  Series 2 of Auf Wiedersehen Pet, the 1990 series House of Cards as media tycoon Benjamin Landless starring alongside Ian Richardson as Francis Urquhart, and the David Leland film The Big Man with Liam Neeson. He was also in Heartbeat and made a brief appearance in the promo video for Tracey Ullman's "Sunglasses".

He appeared in the television series Benidorm as swinger Donald Stewart from 2007 until the end of series 6, that aired in early 2014. In June 2014, it was announced that he had brain cancer. His character did not appear in the seventh series of Benidorm in person but the character's voice was heard on a telephone call, albeit provided by a sound-a-like.

Death
Ireland died of cancer on 31 July 2014, aged 68.

Filmography

References

External links

1945 births
2014 deaths
20th-century Scottish male actors
Scottish theatre directors
People from Paisley, Renfrewshire
Deaths from brain tumor
21st-century Scottish male actors
Scottish male television actors
British theatre directors
Neurological disease deaths in the United Kingdom
Deaths from cancer in the United Kingdom